BSSM is a four-letter acronym that may refer to:

 Bishōjo Senshi Sailor Moon, the Japanese name for the Sailor Moon franchise
 Blood Sugar Sex Magik, an album by the Red Hot Chili Peppers